The 1923–24 Scottish Division One season was won by Rangers by nine points over nearest rival Airdrieonians. Clyde and Clydebank finished 19th and 20th respectively and were relegated to the 1924–25 Scottish Division Two.

League table

Results

References

Scottish Football Archive

1923–24 Scottish Football League
Scottish Division One seasons